General Albert may refer to:

Duke John Albert of Mecklenburg (1857–1920), Prussian Army general of cavalry
John F. Albert (1915–1989), U.S. Air Force brigadier general
Joseph Jean-Baptiste Albert (1771–1822), French Army general de division (major general)
Charles Frederick Albert, Margrave of Brandenburg-Schwedt (1705–1762), Prussian Army lieutenant general